Albrecht Wüstenhagen (19 October 1892 – 26 June 1944) was a general in the Wehrmacht of Nazi Germany during World War II.  He was a recipient of the Knight's Cross of the Iron Cross of Nazi Germany. Wüstenhagen was killed near Vitebsk, Belarus on 26 June 1944 while attempting to lead a breakout commanding the 256th Infantry Division which had recently been encircled during Operation Bagration.

Awards and decorations

 Knight's Cross of the Iron Cross on 2 December 1942 as Oberst and commander of Artillerie-Regiment 129

References

Citations

Bibliography

1892 births
1944 deaths
German Army personnel killed in World War II
Lieutenant generals of the German Army (Wehrmacht)
Recipients of the Knight's Cross of the Iron Cross
People from Mansfeld-Südharz
Military personnel from Saxony-Anhalt
German Army personnel of World War I
Recipients of the Iron Cross (1914), 1st class
German Army generals of World War II